The 2014 Malaysia Cup (Malay: Piala Malaysia 2014) was the 88th edition of the Piala Malaysia, a football tournament held annually by the Football Association of Malaysia. The cup began on August with a preliminary round. A total of 16 teams took part in the competition. The teams were divided into four groups, each containing four teams. The group winners and runner-up teams in the groups after six matches qualified to the quarterfinals. The 2014 Piala Malaysia ended on 1 November 2014 with the final, held at Bukit Jalil National Stadium, where Pahang defeated Johor Darul Ta'zim after a penalty shootout.

Pahang were the defending champions, having beaten Kelantan 1–0 in the previous season's final.

Format 
In this competition, the top 10 teams from 2014 Malaysia Super League is joined by the top 4 teams from 2014 Malaysia Premier League. The remaining 2 teams from 2014 Malaysia Super League and the team who finished 5th and 6th place in the 2014 Malaysia Premier League will battle it out in the playoffs for the remaining 2 spots. The teams will be drawn into four groups of four teams.

Round and draw dates
The draw for the 2014 Piala Malaysia was held on 13 July 2014 at the Dewan Perdana, National Sports Institute with the participating team coaches and captains in attendance.

Play-off

Seeding

Group stage

Group A

Group B

Group C

Group D

Knockout stage

Bracket

Quarterfinals

The first legs were played on 3 September 2014, and the second legs were played on 10 & 11 October 2014.

First leg

Second leg

 Kedah won 4–3 on aggregate.

 Felda United  won 7–3 on aggregate.

 Johor Darul Takzim won 3–1 on aggregate.

 Pahang won 3–2 on aggregate.

Semi finals

The first legs were played on 19 & 20 October 2014, and the second legs were played on 24 & 25 October 2014.

First leg

Second leg

 Pahang won 6–3 on aggregate.

 Johor Darul Takzim  won 6–5 on aggregate.

Final

The final match was played on 1 November 2014

Winners

References

External links
2014 Piala Malaysia, SPMB

2014 in Malaysian football
Malaysia Cup seasons